Amblyseius curticervicalis is a species of mite in the family Phytoseiidae.

References

curticervicalis
Articles created by Qbugbot
Animals described in 1991